

March

March 2 event

March 3 event

March 4 event

March 6 event

March 7 event

March 10 event

March 13 event

March 14 event

March 15 event

March 17 event

March 18 event

March 19 event

March 27 event

March 30 event

March 31 event

April

April 3 event

April 4 event

April 5 event

April 7 event

April 8 event

April 9 event

April 10 event

April 11 event

April 12 event

April 17 event

April 18 event

April 19 event

April 20 event

April 23 event

April 24 event

April 25 event

April 26 event

April 28 event

See also

 Tornadoes of 2008
 List of United States tornadoes from January to February 2008

Footnotes
 This article incorporates quotations from public domain descriptions from the NOAA website.

References

Tornadoes of 2008
2008 natural disasters in the United States
2008, 03
March 2008 events in the United States
April 2008 events in the United States